Oussema Boughanmi (born 5 January 1990) is a Tunisian footballer who plays as a midfielder for Najran.

References

External links
 

1990 births
Living people
Tunisian footballers
Tunisian expatriate footballers
Stade Tunisien players
En Avant Guingamp players
Espérance Sportive de Tunis players
Étoile Sportive du Sahel players
Al-Madina SC players
Al Ittihad Alexandria Club players
Al-Ahli Club (Manama) players
Riffa SC players
Al-Ahli SC (Tripoli) players
ES Métlaoui players
Hajer FC players
Najran SC players
Tunisian Ligue Professionnelle 1 players
Egyptian Premier League players
Bahraini Premier League players
Saudi First Division League players
Expatriate footballers in France
Expatriate footballers in Libya
Expatriate footballers in Egypt
Expatriate footballers in Bahrain
Expatriate footballers in Saudi Arabia
Tunisian expatriate sportspeople in France
Tunisian expatriate sportspeople in Libya
Tunisian expatriate sportspeople in Egypt
Tunisian expatriate sportspeople in Bahrain
Tunisian expatriate sportspeople in Saudi Arabia
Association football midfielders
Libyan Premier League players